Wallace Pike (22 December 1899 – 11 April 1999) was the last known Newfoundland World War I veteran.

Life
He enlisted as a volunteer in the Royal Newfoundland Regiment as an underage soldier. He saw action on the Western Front as a stretcher-bearer where he was wounded twice, once in the leg and once in the hand. At the end of his military service, he held the rank of private. He was honored by Newfoundland Premier Brian Tobin as a veteran who "represented what would later become a Canadian tradition in times of conflict—that of humanitarian and life-saver". France awarded Pike its highest accolade, The Legion of Honour. The award was commemorated in 1998 by French Ambassador Denis Bauchard who praised Pike saying, "Through your courage you sealed forever the eternal bonds of friendship, solidarity and affection between our two countries." Wallace Pike died on April 11, 1999, aged 99—just one month after the deaths of Newfoundland World War I veterans John Brinson and Alexander White.

References

See also
List of last surviving World War I veterans by country

1899 births
1999 deaths
Newfoundland military personnel of World War I
Recipients of the Legion of Honour
Royal Newfoundland Regiment soldiers
Child soldiers in World War I